The 1988 Kent State Golden Flashes football team was an American football team that represented Kent State University in the Mid-American Conference (MAC) during the 1988 NCAA Division I-A football season. In their first season under head coach Dick Crum, the Golden Flashes compiled a 5–6 record (3–5 against MAC opponents), finished in seventh place in the MAC, and outscored all opponents by a combined total of 256 to 250.

The team's statistical leaders included Eric Wilkerson with 1,325 rushing yards, Patrick Young with 650 passing yards, and Fermin Olivera with 180 receiving yards.  Four Kent State players were selected as first-team All-MAC players: center Chip Curtis, defensive back Jamie Howell, defensive lineman Bert Weidner, and tailback Eric Wilkerson.

Schedule

References

Kent State
Kent State Golden Flashes football seasons
Kent State Golden Flashes football